Stuart John Chambers (born May 1956) is a British businessman, the chairman of Rexam and Arm Holdings. He succeeded Sir John Parker as chairman of Anglo American plc from 1 November 2017.

He is a visiting fellow at the Saïd Business School.

References

1956 births
Living people
British businesspeople
Arm Holdings people